Dig-Dig-Joy is the sixth album by the Brazilian music duo Sandy & Junior. It marks the singers' transition from childhood to adolescence, with songs that were said to better fit this new stage in their lives. Crictic's reacitons to the album also noted the duo's graduation from child idols to teenage idols. The album ended up selling over 500 thousand copies, further consolidating their national success and setting them on a path to sold-out stadium concerts, which was soon to follow.

The album's name and title track are said to have come from a game that composer Rick Azevedo knew from when he was a soccer player in the Palmeiras team. Players would gather before the game and play "dig-dig-joy", a game where someone moves and the others have to mimic their actions. It became one of the most successful songs of the duo's career. 

In this album, they also continue following the pattern laid out by previous releases, having Portuguese versions of notable international songs. "Não Ter" ("Non c'è"), originally sang by Laura Pausini, "Etc... e Tal" ("Any Man of Mine"), by Shania Twain, "Como um Flash" ("Flashdance... What a Feeling"), from the movie Flashdance and sang by Irene Cara, "Dias e Noites" ("We've Got Tonight"), a duo sang by Kenny Rogers and Sheena Easton, "Jambalaya" ("Jambalaya (On the Bayou)"), by Hank Williams and "Mamãe Não Me Falou" (Mama Never Told Me 'Bout You), by The Moffatts.

Track listing

References

External links 
 Dig-Dig-Joy at Discogs

Sandy & Junior albums
1996 albums
Dance-pop albums by Brazilian artists
Portuguese-language albums